Firefly was a cellphone aimed at parents to give to their children.

Features

The address book button has up to 20 phone numbers in it. These are to be programmed in by the guardian/parent, who knows a PIN which is intended to keep the child from changing the numbers. In this way, parents control who their kids are calling. The phone also offers a call screening option which, when activated only allows the numbers that are in the phone's memory to call that phone.

The standard features of the phone are up to 8.5 days standby time and up to 6 hours talk time. Texting and download capability are unavailable, which allows parents to manage phone costs.

Firefly cellphones are blue or pink transparent plastic and can be opened by gently pressing up on the transparent knob on the top of the back side. The screen is a small monochrome LCD display, similar to the ones found in many calculators.

The various menus and sub-menus contain the signal strength and battery charge indicators. The menus are used in a similar fashion to setting a watch. Entering DTMF (Tones) can be done during the call by pressing the green key. Entering letters and numbers is accomplished by selecting each character and then confirming it, which moves the cursor to the next blank space – this can also be done easily via the website.

The handset also contains animations, different colours and internal ringtones to entertain the child.

Layout
There are five main keys on the phone, along with several more secondary button:

A "Begin Call" button (visualized by a green phone)
An "End Call" button (visualized by a red phone)
An "Address book" button (visualized by a blue open book)
A "Call Mom" button (visualized by a blue woman-in-dress icon)
A "Call Dad" button (visualized by a blue man icon)
An emergency 9-1-1 button (visualized by small button with cross) (right side button)
Two buttons to control the volume (visualized by two arrows) (left side button)
An animation button which will display the animation set in the menu (left side button between the volume buttons)

See also
Verizon Wireless Migo, successor phone to the Firefly

References

 Firefly mobile phone designed for four year-olds – Telegraph
 Firefly Mobile's Metamorphosis – Forbes.com
 Firefly mobile aimed at toddlers | News | PC Pro
 Firefly Review & Rating | PCMag.com

External links
Firefly Mobile
Firefly Ireland and UK

Mobile phone manufacturers
Mobile phones